Maghera is a parish in County Londonderry, Northern Ireland. It is bordered by the parishes of Ballynascreen, Ballyscullion, Desertmartin, Dungiven, Kilcronaghan, Killelagh, Magherafelt, Tamlaght O'Crilly, and Termoneeny. As a civil parish it lies within the former barony of Loughinsholin and as an ecclesiastical parish it lies within the Church of Ireland Diocese of Derry and Raphoe.

Name
The name Maghera is derived from the Irish Machaire Rátha meaning "plain of the fort", however this is itself derived from the older name for the parish, Ráth Lúraigh, meaning "Lúrach's fort". One manuscript states that Lúrach was from Ráith, which is given as possibly being an even earlier name for the parish before Lúrach's name was suffixed to it.

History
Lúrach mac Cuanach is the 6th-century patron of the eccesliastical parish, with the local parish church, St. Lurachs, named after him. Lúrach's family held a degree of political importance in the area, with seven descendants of Lúrach's father Cuanu being kings of Airgíalla. Circumstantial evidence places their center of power at Ráth Lúraigh.

St. Lurach's church was plundered by Vikings in 832 according to the Annals of Ulster, and in 1135 was one of several churches burnt down. The ruins of the medieval church still stand in the town of Maghera in the townland of Largantogher, with the earliest remaining sections dating to the 12th century.

In 1111, the parish of Maghera was incorporated into the diocese of the Cinéal Eoghain, the seat of which was located at Ardstraw. In 1150 however the seat was transferred to Maghera, until 1254 when after complaints of its isolation from the "mainstream of civilisation" it was removed to Derry.

As a result of the Plantation of Ulster, the lands of the parish of Maghera were divided among three of the London livery companies, the Drapers, Mercers, and Vintners. A large portion of land around the modern settlement of Maghera was given over to the Established Church.

Settlements
Culnady
Curran
Maghera
Gulladuff
Upperlands

Townlands

The ecclesiastical parish of Maghera consists of 38 townlands, however the civil parish consists of 37, with the townland of Upperland being omitted. Until the 1840s, Maghera ecclesiastical parish consisted of 42 townloads, when the townloads of Beagh Temporal, Culnagrew, Swatragh and Knockoneill were transferred to the neighbouring parish of Killelagh.

See also
Beagh
List of civil parishes of County Londonderry

References

 
Mid-Ulster District